Girardeau House is a national historic site located at 950 East Washington Street, Monticello, Florida in Jefferson County.

It was added to the National Register of Historic Places on June 30, 2011.

References

National Register of Historic Places in Jefferson County, Florida